Oliver Ransom Tappin (June 16, 1893 – November 18, 1945) was a Michigan politician.

Political life
The Flint City Commission select him as mayor in 1940.

References

Mayors of Flint, Michigan
1893 births
1945 deaths
20th-century American politicians
People from Suamico, Wisconsin